The Stephen Hui Geological Museum is the first and only geological museum in Hong Kong. It is located on the ground and first floors of the James Hsioung Lee Building, in the University of Hong Kong Main Campus. The museum is part of the Department of Earth Sciences, the only earth sciences department in Hong Kong.

With the goal of making the rock collection available for public viewing, the museum opened on January 16, 2009. It houses around 10,000 catalogued specimens from different parts of the world.

The museum is open from Mondays to Fridays, 1PM to 6PM, with mornings reserved for guided group tours.

External links
 Museum official website

Geology museums
University of Hong Kong
Natural history museums in China
Natural history museums
University museums in Hong Kong